Mount Gleadell is a nearly conical ice-free peak,  high, the highest summit on the headland just north of Observation Island at the east side of Amundsen Bay, Antarctica. It was sighted in October 1956 by an Australian National Antarctic Research Expeditions party under P.W. Crohn, and was named for Geoffrey Gleadell, a cook at Mawson Station in 1954.

References

Mountains of Enderby Land